Tyrese Hunter (born August 11, 2003) is an American college basketball player for the Texas Longhorns of the Big 12 Conference. He previously played college basketball at Iowa State.

High school career 
Hunter attended St Catherine's High School in Racine, Wisconsin where he played on the basketball team, scoring 1,589 career points, and leading the team to a Division 3 Wisconsin State Championship as a senior. A consensus 4 star prospect ranked the nations #37 overall recruit, he committed to Iowa State University to play college basketball.

College career 
As a freshman at Iowa State, Hunter averaged 11.0 points, 4.9 assists and 2.0 assists per game. In the Cyclones opening game of the 2022 NCAA Tournament, Hunter scored a season high 23 points to lead Iowa State to a 59–54 victory over LSU. At the conclusion of his freshman season, Hunter was named the Big 12 Freshman of the year. On April 18, 2022, Hunter announced that he was entering the transfer portal. Ranked the nations #3 overall transfer by ESPN, Hunter would transfer to the University of Texas at Austin.

References

External links 

 Iowa State bio

2003 births
Living people
American men's basketball players
Basketball players from Wisconsin
Texas Longhorns men's basketball players
Iowa State Cyclones men's basketball players
Point guards